Lawrence Joseph Manogue  (14 June 1875 – 7 September 1925) was a British athlete. He competed in the 1908 Summer Olympics in London. He was born in Callan, County Kilkenny, Ireland and died in Barry, Vale of Glamorgan, Wales. In the 800 metres, Manogue did not finish his semifinal heat, dropping out around the half way mark and not advancing to the final. There is some discussion as to how he was selected to the British team in the first place.  His previous known competition had him finishing last in the slow heat at the AAA Championships.

References

Sources
 
 
 

1875 births
1925 deaths
Athletes (track and field) at the 1908 Summer Olympics
Olympic athletes of Great Britain
British male middle-distance runners
Irish male middle-distance runners
People from County Kilkenny